Logan Regional Hospital is a 146-bed general hospital located in Logan, Utah. It is owned by Intermountain Healthcare. The hospital serves Cache Valley, including Cache County, Utah and Franklin County, Idaho, and western Wyoming. Logan Regional's mission is "Helping People Live the Healthiest Lives Possible." The hospital services include a Level III Trauma Center, Cancer Center, Women and Newborn Center, digital imaging services, and heart catheterization services. Logan Regional was named one of the United States' 100 top hospitals in 2018, marking the sixth consecutive year it has received this honor.

History
The predecessor to Logan Regional Hospital, and Cache Valley's first hospital, was the William Budge Memorial Hospital. Built in 1914, it was a 50-bed facility that offered operating rooms and maternity care. In 1948, The Church of Jesus Christ of Latter-day Saints acquired Cache Valley's two hospitals, The Budge Memorial Hospital and Cache Valley General Hospital, as part of the church's health system. In 1975, The Church of Jesus Christ of Latter-day Saints turned over its system of 15 hospitals, including Logan LDS Hospital, to the communities they served. A secular, not-for-profit health care system, Intermountain Healthcare was formed to operate the hospital system. Logan LDS Hospital was renamed Logan Hospital. The hospital relocated in 1980 to a larger, more modern facility where they continue to operate. Since relocating, Logan Regional has added the Intermountain Budge Clinic (opened in 2000) to the hospital campus, a Women and Newborn Center (opened in 2007), and a Cancer Center (opened in 2008). In 2015, Logan Regional Hospital and the Budge Clinic expanded its facility by 154,000 square feet.

Services
Logan Regional provides cancer services, a level III trauma center, heart services, inpatient care units, outpatient services, rehabilitation and therapy, a sleep center, sports medicine, orthopedics, surgical services, a Women and Newborn Center, Wound and Hyperbaric Center, a Nutrition and Weight Center, and a Community Education Center.

Cancer services
Logan Regional provides cancer services including brachytherapy, chemotherapy, and radiation oncology services. In addition to cancer screenings and support services, the cancer center is accredited as an Intermountain Cancer Center, and is recognized for providing patients with access to a full scope of services required to diagnose, treat, rehabilitate, and support patients with cancer.

Cardiac services
In 2012, Logan Regional added two new heart catheterization labs which provide diagnostic and an interventional heart program, specialized radiology services and pain management procedures. These services were provided for in part by more than $400,000 in donations.

Orthopedics and sports medicine
Logan Regional's Certified Sports Medicine Physicians provide a full range of sports medicine and orthopedic care for athletes, including a concussion clinic. Logan Regional Orthopedics and Sports Medicine is the official medical provider for:
Utah State University
Sky View High School
Mountain Crest High School
Ridgeline High School
Green Canyon High School

Women & newborn center
Logan Regional provides services for pregnancy, labor & delivery, breastfeeding support, a neonatal care unit, and a mammography and imaging center. With an average of 2,500 babies born at the hospital each year, this is the largest service provided at Logan Regional.

References

External links

Intermountain Healthcare - Official Homepage

Hospital buildings completed in 1980
Hospitals in Utah
Intermountain Health
Buildings and structures in Logan, Utah
1975 establishments in Utah